Les Vans is a commune in the Ardèche department in the Auvergne-Rhône-Alpes region of southern France.

Geography
The village of Les Vans, the principal settlement of the canton of the same name in the south of the Ardèche, lies at the centre of a basin near the Chassezac river.
Dominant to the south is the Serre de Barre, the last western summit of the Cévennes du Bas-Vivarais range.
In 2001, Les Vans became the "gateway town" of the Monts d'Ardèche Natural Regional Park.

The village is a tourist haven in summer; a traditional market is held every Saturday morning.

A night-time craft market is held on summer Tuesdays at the Place de la Fontaine.

Many activities are available in the vicinity of Les Vans: walking, climbing, caving, horse riding, canyoning, swimming, fishing and kayaking in the Chassezac gorges.

History
Les Vans was a dependency of the Abbey of Saint-Gilles. The town became Protestant in the 16th century; in 1629 it returned to Catholicism, and its fortifications were dismantled.

On the death of Professor Ollier (1900), who lived near the village church,
a world-wide subscription paid for the erection of two monumental bronze statues,
created by Boucher. One at Les Vans on Grande Place Ollier, the other at Place Ollier in Lyon.
The Vanséens' cunning preserved the first from the covetousness of the Germans during the Second World War,
though the second was melted down by the Wehrmacht in 1941.

In 1972, the commune of Les Vans amalgamated with those of Brahic, Chassagnes and Naves.

Administration

Population

Its residents are called Vanséens.

Sights

Les Vans
 Historic centre (many buildings of the 16th to 19th centuries)
 Church of Saint-Pierre (dating from the seventeenth century); fine walnut retable of 17th century
 Protestant church with pillars, inaugurated on 7 May 1826
 Gorges of the river Chassezac
 Païolive wood
 Les Vans is the starting point of many excursions and walks in the Cévennes Vivarais region

The hamlet of Naves
Medieval village, ranked among the most beautiful villages in France and called "a characteristic village of the Ardèche".
Naves had its moment of glory in the 19th century with the development of sericulture and silkwork breeding.
This activity declined bit by bit and fell into disuse.
The village, its church and its ancient alleys were the subject of important renovations in the mid-1980s.

Sights
 Romanesque church of Saint-Jacques from the 12th and 13th centuries, recently restored
 Ancient cobbled streets and vaulted passages
 Ruins of the ancient castle and ramparts
 Starting point of many excursions and walks

The hamlet of Chassagnes
 Sandy and pebble beach beside the river Chassezac
 The hermitage of Saint-Eugène was built on a limestone cliff overlooking the valley of the Chassezac and Chassagnes.
Some years ago it was the subject of restoration which brought it back to life after more than two centuries of decay,
returning it to something like its original purpose.
Notable on this site are some very fine reproduction Byzantine frescoes
which have recently been produced, free of charge, by an iconographic painter.

The hamlet of Brahic
The hamlet of Brahic nestles on the south face of the Serre de Barre. Sights:

 The ancient village of Brahic
 Romanesque church of Notre Dame de l'Assomption with its arcaded tower (12th century)
 Picturesque hamlets of Murjas and Perriès

Economy
 Oil mill "Froment" (site)
 Textile factory Payen

Events
 Craft market every Saturday morning
 Olive festival on the 3rd Sunday in July
 "Castagnade" chestnut festival on the last Saturday in October
 "Potters' market" and "leather-wood? market" in July
 Footpath festival on Pentecost Monday
 Ard'Afrique festival in August: African culture, jazz, cultural displays, concerts, exhibitions, dance ...

Personalities
 Eugène de Malbos (1811–1858), born in Les Vans, was a Romantic painter known for his lithographs.
 Louis Léopold Ollier (1830–1900), inventor of orthopaedics and reconstructive surgery, was born in Les Vans
 Léonce Vieljeux (1865–1944), Mayor of La Rochelle, reserve Colonel and network agent of the Allied Resistance, was born in Les Vans; he was executed at Struthof in 1944. The college at Les Vans today bears his name.
 Bernadette Perrin-Riou (born 1955), mathematician and recipient of the Satter Prize, was born in Les Vans.

Gallery

See also
 Long-distance footpath Sentier de grande randonnée GR 4
 Communes of the Ardèche department

References

External links

Vans